RNZAF Base Woodbourne is a base of the Royal New Zealand Air Force, located 8 km west of Blenheim.

Woodbourne was established in 1939 as the base for No. 2 Service Flying Training School (No.2 SFTS). Also located nearby during World War II were the ground training camps of the Delta. In 1942–43, No. 16 Squadron RNZAF and No. 18 Squadron RNZAF Squadrons flying Curtiss P-40 Warhawks used the satellite Fairhall field. In 1945 No.2 SFTS was closed and the Royal New Zealand Air Force Central Flying School and some ground training units, including the Officers' School of Instruction were relocated to Woodbourne. In 1949, The Aircraft Repair Depot RNZAF was relocated from Ohakea, and in 1951 the Boy Entrant School was established at Woodbourne.

Today, Woodbourne is the Air Force's only support base and has no operational squadrons based there. It shares its runways with the Blenheim civil airport, Woodbourne Airport.

The Ground Training Wing was created in 1995 from existing units at Woodbourne and those relocated from Wigram and Hobsonville, and is responsible for the training of recruits (General Service Training School), initial officer training (Command Training School), trade training (except aircrew, medical and photography training) and command training.

Woodbourne was the Air Force's only heavy maintenance facility for the repair of aircraft airframes, engines and avionics systems. This squadron was responsible for reconditioning airframes of RNZAF aircraft. It was known as the Airframe Reconditioning Squadron RNZAF. The unit was commercialised in 1998 and was managed by SAFE Air Ltd. In 2015 SAFE Air Ltd was purchased by Airbus and it continues to maintain military aircraft. SAFE Air Ltd formally relinquished the name and now trades under Airbus Asia Pacific. Airbus is currently finishing the last of the Air Force's C-130 Hercules airframe refurbishments. This will see the most highly houred C-130 Hercules (NZ7002) remain in flying service.

Personnel strength around 800

Units based at Woodbourne
RNZAF Police
RNZAF Rescue Fire
NZDF Physical Training Instructors School
RNZAF Security Forces
RNZAF Logistics
Base Medical
Airbus
Directorate of Defence Security
Nelson Marlborough Institute of Technology Aeronautical Engineering programme

See also
List of New Zealand military bases

References

External links
RNZAF Base Woodbourne

Woodbourne
Buildings and structures in the Marlborough Region
1939 establishments in New Zealand
Transport buildings and structures in the Marlborough Region